May Oo (born Hein Min Oo; on 29 July 1988) is a Burmese make-up artist and LGBTQ+ rights activist. He was named in The Myanmar Times "Top 10 Make-up artists" list in 2018.

Following the 2021 Myanmar coup d'état, May Oo became one of the most prominent revolutionaries of Myanmar's ruling military junta. Because of his involvement in anti-coup protests, an arrest warrant was issued for him.

Early life and education
May Oo was born on July 29, 1988, in Yangon, Myanmar. He favoured a female identity and was constantly misunderstood, discriminated against, and abused, even within his family. He attended high school at Basic Education High School No. 1 Dawbon and studied at East Yangon University.

Career
Around 2007, May Oo learned make-up artistry from make-up artist December Hnin. At the age of 26, May Oo opened his own beauty salon in Yangon.
He offered to work for popular movie stars and made a name for himself in the make-up industry. He rose to prominence while working with actress Wutt Hmone Shwe Yi.

In 2016, he studied make-up at the Make Up Forever Academy and Chic Studio in New York. In 2018, he partnered with Maybelline Myanmar and joined as a make-up artist at New York Fashion Week. He was chosen as make-up artist for the popular film Mi.

May Oo opened the beauty school CMM Luxury Beauty Academy & Studio in 2018 and May & Co Wedding Planner in 2019. In April 2019, he won the Costume and Makeup Award for his work with the film Mi at the 2018 Star Awards Ceremony.

LGBT icon
May Oo is recognized as an LGBT role model by the Burmese LGBT community. May Oo and his boyfriend Han Lin are known as Myanmar's LGBT icon couple. They are LGBTQ+ rights activists and advocates for LGBT rights in Myanmar, and have actively participated in many LGBT rights campaigns in Yangon.

Donations
In 2018, May Oo and his boyfriend Han Lin donated two rings worth a total of 86 lakh Burmese Kyats to Botataung Pagoda on Myanmar New Year's Day.

Political activities
Following the 2021 Myanmar coup d'état, May Oo participated in the anti-coup movement both in person at rallies and through social media. Denouncing the military coup, he took part in protests, starting in February of that year. He joined the "We Want Justice" three-finger salute movement. The movement was launched on social media, and has been joined by many celebrities.

On 2 April 2021, warrants for May Oo's arrest were issued under Section 505 (a) of the penal code by the State Administration Council for speaking out against the military coup. Along with several other celebrities, he was charged with calling for participation in the Civil Disobedience Movement (CDM), damaging the state's ability to govern, supporting the Committee Representing Pyidaungsu Hluttaw, and with generally inciting the people to disturb the peace and stability of the nation. The charges prompted him to flee to the jungle where he joined the Free Burma Rangers. 

He eventually fled to the United States as a political refugee. On 17 February 2022, his homes and business property were confiscated by the military council.

References

External links 
 

1988 births
Living people
People from Yangon
Burmese make-up artists
Burmese revolutionaries
Burmese LGBT people
Burmese LGBT rights activists